Puerto Rico Highway 344 (PR-344) is a rural road in Hormigueros, Puerto Rico, beginning from near the municipality's small downtown and ending at PR-348 near the border with San Germán in barrio Rosario. It has narrow lanes, and after about five kilometers becomes one of the most dangerous highways in Puerto Rico, as it goes near a precipice with little or no safety barriers. It serves as a route to Mayagüez via PR-348 which ends in Puerto Rico Alt Route 2 (Calle Ramón Emeterio Betances, or locally Calle Post).

Major intersections

Related route

Puerto Rico Highway 3344 (PR-3344) is a spur route located in Hormigueros. It begins at PR-344 north of downtown and ends at its junction with PR-309 near PR-2.

See also

 List of highways numbered 344

References

External links
 

344